The 1974 Currie Cup was the 36th edition of the Currie Cup, the premier annual domestic rugby union competition in South Africa.

Results

Semi-final

Final

See also

 Currie Cup

References

1974
1974 in South African rugby union
1974 rugby union tournaments for clubs